Cory Mitchell Mazzoni (born October 19, 1989) is an American former professional baseball pitcher. He previously played in Major League Baseball (MLB) for the San Diego Padres and Chicago Cubs.

Amateur career
Mazzoni graduated from Seneca Valley High School in Harmony, Pennsylvania. He was drafted out of high school by the Washington Nationals in the 26th round of the 2008 MLB draft, but decided not to sign. He instead enrolled at North Carolina State University (NC State), where he played college baseball for the NC State Wolfpack baseball team.

Professional career

New York Mets
The New York Mets of Major League Baseball (MLB) selected Mazzoni in the second round of the 2011 MLB draft. He made his professional debut with the Brooklyn Cyclones of the Class A-Short Season New York–Penn League in 2011, and pitched for the St. Lucie Mets of the Class A-Advanced Florida State League in 2012. Pitching for the Binghamton Mets of the Class AA Eastern League in 2013, Mazzoni had a 4.36 earned run average and 74 strikeouts in 66 innings pitched.  His 2013 season ended prematurely when he required surgery to repair a torn meniscus in his knee.

The Mets invited Mazzoni to spring training in 2014. On March 18, they assigned him to minor league camp. He played for the Las Vegas 51s of the Class AAA Pacific Coast League (PCL) that year. After the 2014 season, the Mets added Mazzoni to their 40-man roster to protect him from being eligible in the Rule 5 draft.

San Diego Padres
On March 30, 2015, the Mets traded Mazzoni and a player to be named later to the San Diego Padres for Alex Torres. He began the season with the El Paso Chihuahuas of the PCL, and was promoted to the major leagues on April 26. He made his MLB debut as a relief pitcher the next day.

Mazzoni began the 2016 season with El Paso. He was designated for assignment by the Padres on April 26, 2016. He was released on May 3, but signed a minor league contract with the Padres on May 16. The Padres promoted Mazzoni back to the major leagues in September 2017.

Chicago Cubs
The Chicago Cubs claimed Mazzoni from the Padres off of waivers on November 6, 2017, and then he was claimed again off waivers, by the Los Angeles Dodgers, on March 27, 2018. On March 29, he returned to the Cubs when they claimed him off waivers from the Dodgers. On August 30, Mazzoni was designated for assignment, when the Cubs acquired catcher Bobby Wilson. He elected free agency on November 3, 2018.

References

External links

1989 births
Living people
Arizona League Padres players
Baseball players from Pennsylvania
Binghamton Mets players
Brooklyn Cyclones players
Chicago Cubs players
El Paso Chihuahuas players
Gulf Coast Mets players
Iowa Cubs players
Las Vegas 51s players
Major League Baseball pitchers
NC State Wolfpack baseball players
People from Butler County, Pennsylvania
San Diego Padres players
St. Lucie Mets players